Route 212 is a collector road in the Canadian province of Nova Scotia.

It is located in the Halifax Regional Municipality and connects Enfield at Exit 5 on Highway 102 with Route 357 at Elderbank in the Musquodoboit Valley.

The route is known as the "Old Guysborough Road" as it was the colonial military road from Halifax to Guysborough.

Communities
Enfield
Halifax Stanfield International Airport
Goffs
Devon
Wyses Corner
Elderbank

Parks
Dollar Lake Provincial Park
Elderbank Provincial Park

See also
List of Nova Scotia provincial highways

References

Roads in Halifax, Nova Scotia
Nova Scotia provincial highways